Fags, Mags and Bags is a Scottish radio comedy broadcast on BBC Radio 4. Its first series was nominated for a Sony Radio Award.

The writers, Sanjeev Kohli and Donald McLeary, received a Writers Guild Award in November 2008 for Radio Comedy of the Year.

The theme music for the show is "Smiling" by the Beta Band. In September 2017 the producer Gus Beattie revealed the list of other tracks considered for the theme, which included songs by The Go! Team, The Fratellis and The Breeders, among many others.

On 4 October 2013 it was announced on the Official Facebook page that the episode "Meter Reading Chic" would be the final episode of the show. On 4 January 2016 however, it was announced that following a hiatus of three years the show would be returning for a sixth series, that was recorded in February and broadcast in April of that year. A seventh series was announced in June 2017 consisting of 4 episodes, broadcast in August and September 2017, and it was recommissioned for an eighth, ninth and tenth series, which were broadcast in 2018, 2020 and 2022 respectively.

Cast
Sanjeev Kohli as Ramesh Majhu
Donald McLeary as Dave Legg
Omar Raza as Sanjay Majhu
Kayvan Novak as Alok Majhu (series 1)
Susheel Kumar as Alok Majhu (series 2-9)

Recurring guest cast:

Gerard Kelly as Father Henderson (Series 1-3)
Michael Redmond as Bishop Briggs
Tom Urie as frequent guest, many different roles
Leah MacRae as Keenan's mum, Kate, Susan (series 1)
Michele Gallagher as Gillian, Keenan's mum (series 2)
Maureen Carr as Keenan's mum (series 3)
Marjorie Hogarth as Mrs Begg/Gibb
Julie Wilson Nimmo as Lovely Sue
Kate Brailsford as Hilly Bewerdine
Steven McNicoll as Bra Jeff
Sean Scanlan as Mutton Jeff
Stewart Cairns as Gay Alan, Mrs Birkett
Greg McHugh as Keith Futures
Mina Anwar as Malcolm

Characters

Ramesh Majhu

Ramesh is a middle-aged shopkeeper, born in India but a long-term resident of the Glasgow suburb of Lenzie. He has been the proprietor of the local convenience store Fags, Mags & Bags for over 30 years. In the episode 'Evil Narbara' from series four, Ramesh reveals that he opened the store on the same day the Double Decker chocolate bar was launched. This would place the opening of Fags, Mags & Bags in 1976.

Ramesh pursues his chosen career in low-return retail with a near religious zeal, possessing an encyclopaedic knowledge of product lines and a deft line in banter, seeing his shop as a microcosm of life. Twenty years hard "shop" has earned Ramesh a tan Mercedes and a pair of mushroom-coloured tasselled loafers.

Despite a ceaseless quest for the secondary purchase, and organising a fictional festival solely to boost sales, Ramesh seems to genuinely have his customers' interests at heart.  He is popular with fellow shopkeepers; chairing the local Traders' Association, and also won the coveted 'Shopkeeper of the Year Award' in the Small-to-Medium Retail Concern category in Series 2.

Ramesh is a widower, having married his wife in an arranged marriage during the 1960s. By the end of series 5 Ramesh had begun a relationship with a lady called Malcolm, and they are still an item at the start of series 6, then through into series 7.

It is revealed that he has no sense of smell, and is a fan of the TV show Lost. Ramesh also experimented with a perm at one point in homage to the tennis star John McEnroe.

Dave Legg

Dave is Ramesh's best friend and assistant at Fags, Mags & Bags.  An amiable man in his forties, he has worked for Ramesh for many years and shares his enthusiasm for all things "shop" and the music of Barbara Dickson.

Despite his easy-going nature, Dave is periodically beset by anxieties about his job and status; suffering a full scale breakdown, brought on by Ramesh's mother-in-law. It was also revealed early on that despite his skill in the art of shopkeeping, he is unable to mind the store on his own; for reasons as yet undisclosed. He appears to be a widower, like Ramesh, as he made a reference to his wife's death certificate in the series 4 episode "Foam Wizards". He seems to have had children, as he mentions receiving Father's Day gifts in "The Festival of Maltodextrin", but they are never hinted at again. Dave briefly dated a pet psychologist named Kate during the second series, and a man named Lesley between series 6 and 7.

Dave has a talent for creating compound words, and also attempted to popularise the catchphrase Five Alive with limited success.

Alok Majhu

Ramesh's elder son sees himself as a forward thinking entrepreneur and tends to conduct conversations in marketing jargon. Alok views his father's low-return empire with disdain and is engaged in an ongoing and futile attempt to drag his father's shop upmarket.

Alok has a vastly over inflated sense of his abilities as a businessman and his ventures such as the Lembit Opik Pita Heater invariably meet with disaster. This was particularly apparent in the episode "The Wrath Of Khan" when Alok's decision to install a Slush Machine lead to a full scale retail war with the cafe at the Lenzie Leisuredome.

This unwillingness to master the day to day realities of running a suburban confectioners causes Ramesh amusement and despair in equal measure, he is unwilling to leave Alok in charge of the shop for the weekend whilst he goes away on a murder mystery weekend.

Sanjay Majhu

Ramesh's youngest son is in his late teens and shares his brother's disdain for the world of low-return retail. However unlike Alok this is due to teenage apathy and general surliness rather than a desire to pursue a high flying business career. Sanjay litters his conversation with SMS language and contemporary slang and treats customers with scarcely disguised indifference.

Despite this, Sanjay displays some flair for shopkeeping in "The De-Magowaning of Ramesh" where he successfully sells several secondary purchases.  Sanjay also manages to show an aptitude for tabloid style reporting during work experience at a local newspaper, but with characteristic lack of tact manages to alienate Ramesh's customers and fellow shopkeepers by printing scurrilous stories about them.

Sanjay also briefly sported a moustache much to the amusement of Ramesh and Dave.

Episodes

Series 1
 "Raising Keenan": Ramesh is keen that young tearaway Keenan has good male role models. His solution is to engineer a meeting with potential suitors for Keenan's mum.
 "The De-Magowaning of Ramesh": Ramesh is delighted as he teaches his son Sanjay some of the finer arts of shopkeeping. But is his eagerness only because he wants to borrow his dad's Merc?
 "Wall of Crisps": A new corn and maize-based snack sparks trouble in the corner shop.
 "Build The Titanic": Corner shop customer Mrs Muirhead's part-work magazine model ship faces stormy waters.
 "The Festival of Maltodextrin": Ramesh concocts a fake religious festival to shift unsold fireworks.
 "January February": Trouble brews when Ramesh agrees to let a member of the UKRP ("United Kingdom Racist Party") put a poster up in his shop window, but Ramesh has the last laugh.

Series 2
 "Beansy, Beansy, Beansy, Beansy, Beansy": Ramesh and Dave come to the rescue after a number of local cats go missing.
 "Skeletor Attack": Ramesh's life is turned upside down when an elderly and despised aunt turns up uninvited. (featuring Nina Wadia as Skeletor)
 "Rameshtonite": Trouble looms for Ramesh as his banter-nemesis Tom Skilliter re-appears after 20 years.
 "All the Best": Lenzie turns feral after Ramesh sells cards with abusive messages to the locals.
 "Cousin Wacko": Ramesh's nephew arrives from India, complete with impressive shopkeeping skills, much to Alok's disgust.
 "Confectionary McEnroe": Tensions run high as Ramesh gears up for the Shopkeeper of the Year award.

Series 3
 "Jack Black's Black Jacks": Sanjay finds a girlfriend and embraces the arts, much to Ramesh and Dave's amusement.
 "Mr Majhu Goes To Lenzie": Ramesh inadvertently enters the murky world of Lenzie politics.
 "The Wrath Of Khan": The delicate eco-balance of the shop is at stake as Ramesh caves to Alok's idea of installing a slush machine.
 "The Lenzie Splicer": Dave is thrown into turmoil after an old school friend appears in the shop.
 "Bacon Punctuation": The future of the shop's much-loved 'Wall of Crisps' comes under threat.
 "The Fall of Phallon and the Rise of Bugatox": Ramesh takes it upon himself to reunite a local couple who have split up.

Series 4
 "Foam Wizards": Ramesh and Alok go head-to-head in a sweetie design competition.
 "Magical Mister Murgatroyd": Alok announces his sudden engagement to Siddiqua, the daughter of the owner of the local Pennywise retail empire and shop rival to Ramesh. But is it love that is driving Alok, or the promise of a gadget-filled backshop?
 "The Bewerdine Spectrum": Sanjay causes chaos in Lenzie when he starts work experience at the local paper.
 "Evil Narbara": The local traders are in revolt after a rowdy party shop opens in Lenzie.
 "Ayabassa Alan": The new dance craze of Ayabassa sweeps Lenzie, and Dave finds a new friend.
 "John Craven's Fjällräven": Dave and the boys organise a surprise 50th birthday party for Ramesh, but will Sanjay manage to keep his trap closed long enough without spilling the beans before the big day?

Series 5
 "Hovering Chops": The arrival of a new butcher's shop causes strife in the traders' community.
 "General Whitesnake Demeanour": The new priest in Lenzie, Father Green, is under scrutiny from the bishop. Note: Father Neil Green was named after long time fan of the show Neil Green.
 "Effervescent Members": Local headmistress Mrs Temple tackles Ramesh over a new range of sweets.
 "Carnaptious Scroosh": Mrs Birkett locks horns with Lovely Sue, while Alok and Sanjay find a new cool friend.
 "Turn Around Dave Eyes": Dave starts chatting online and Ramesh has a wobble about an upcoming date.
 "Meter Reading Chic": Ramesh decides it is time to ponder retirement from the corner shop game.

Series 6
 "Chickpea Landslide": Ramesh's girlfriend opens a food bank in Lenzie, but she has got competition.
 "Schrodinger's Birkenstock Interface Situation": A church-organised community choir-off results in a Fifa-esque bribery scandal.
 "Glamper, Camper, Pamper, Hamper": Keenan discovers a talent at Badminton and becomes a local Lenziden hero.
 "Crispquilibrium": The Wall of Crisps is embroiled in a political scandal.
 "Downton Abbey Voice Changer Helmet": Mutton Jeff finds love. The only hiccup - she's a vegan.
 "Operation Voldemort Scrape-Away": Ramesh and Malcolm's relationship moves up a gear which prompts Dave to try online dating.

Series 7
 "Burger, Burger, Burger, Burger, Burger": In this opening episode, we pick up on Dave's relationship with his best friend Lesley (Simon Greenall). Does Dave see a future in the friendship, and what does Lenzie think of his blossoming bromance?
 "Wizardy Lizardy Gubbins": Local psychic and futurologist Keith Futures (Greg McHugh) finds it hard to find a buyer for his Komodo Dragon. Meanwhile, Mrs Birkett mourns the passing of her beloved cat, Biscuits.
 "Cumulus Nimbus": Alok's former best friend at school returns to Lenzie to host a film audition. Fraser Linlithgow (Sean Biggerstaff) is now a big hit in Hollywood, and Alok is keen to cash in on his fame.
 "Begrudging a Crunchie": Malcolm surprises Ramesh by announcing she wants to become a Foster carer.

Series 8
 "A Song for Lenzie": Ramesh discovers to his horror that Sanjay hasn't been entirely truthful about his college education after The Bish spots him busking in East Kilbride.
 "The Rubington's Doobery 9000": Ramesh gets his fiancé Malcolm jealous when it's revealed that the Cash and Carry promotions manager, Helena, fancies him.
 "Lenzie Has Fallen": Mrs Birkett raises suspicions about the source of a lurgy outbreak in Lenzie and starts to point an accusing finger at Hilly.
 "Ladychase": The local Provost for Lenzie needs help to raise funds to create a tourist attraction for the town.

Series 9
 "Hamster Gamut": Ramesh is delighted that the new Lenzie House Of Wax is proving a hit as stock has been flying off the shelves. But not everyone is happy with the number of visitors to the town.
 "Bishop's Finger": Ramesh gets jealous after his fiancée Malcolm gets closer to Lenzie's new Hipster butcher, Nathan Laser, after he sponsors her new women’s football team.
 "The Mike Leigh Theory": Dave introduces his new girlfriend Margot, but not everyone is convinced.
 "Soup Murder": Ramesh and Malcolm’s wedding day plans upset a few people, including Sanjay who wants to perform at the reception with his new horrible band.

Series 10

 "Racismpalooza": Ramesh tries to help Mrs Birkett who is being pursued by the immigration services.
 "Jeff Capes Five Egger": Dave tries to make friends with Pummie, his food delivery driver - but has he crossed the customer/delivery driver friend line?
 "Full Five Pencil Belter": Jemima Rocking-Horse, the new curator of the Lenzie House of Wax, is angry that Fags, Mags & Bags is taking their trade away.
 "Florence Flouncingtons who lives in Flouncingtons Quadrant on the Flouncingtons Estate": Sanjay causes a bit of gossip amongst the Lenzidens as he helps his best mate Grebo with a secret mission.

Guest appearances
The show has featured guest stars in a number of episodes:

 Nina Wadia (EastEnders, Goodness Gracious Me)
 Ron Donachie (Titanic)
 Greg McHugh (Gary: Tank Commander)
 Mina Anwar (The Thin Blue Line, The Wright Way)
 Sean Biggerstaff (Harry Potter (film series))
 Tom Urie (River City)
 Maureen Carr (Still Game)
 Michael Redmond (Father Ted)
 Sylvester McCoy (Doctor Who, The Hobbit)
 Hardeep Singh Kohli (presenter, brother of Sanjeev Kohli)
 Kevin Eldon (Nighty Night)
 Barry Howard (Hi-De-Hi)
 Julie T. Wallace (The Fifth Element)
 David Kay (Mordrin McDonald: 21st Century Wizard)
 Julia Deakin (Spaced)
 Simon Greenall (I'm Alan Partridge)
 Lorraine McIntosh (Deacon Blue)

Live shows

On 13 March 2013 the official Facebook page for the series announced a live show was to be performed towards the end of April 2013. On 9 April it was confirmed to be taking place on Tuesday 30 April 2013 at Oran Mor, in Glasgow. The two episodes that were performed, as live readings, were "Hovering Chops" and "Meter Reading Chic", both from series 5. The readings contained extra material that had been cut from the radio versions. Stewart Cairns took on the role of Frank Butcher in "Hovering Chops", that had originally been played by Barry Howard. In August 2017, Sanjeev and Donald stated in an interview that they were in the early stages of planning a touring live show. On 23 April 2019 Sanjeev Kohli announced that a live show would be taking place throughout the 2019 Edinburgh Festival Fringe, again in the form of script readings. The Fringe run was an adapted version of the episode "Meter Reading Chic", extended to run to an hour long performance.

References

External links

BBC Radio comedy programmes
BBC Radio 4 programmes
2007 radio programme debuts
Lenzie
Television series by Banijay